Gebbie is a surname. Notable people with the surname include:

Bert Gebbie (born 1934), Scottish former professional footballer
Edene Gebbie (born 1995), Papua New Guinean rugby league footballer
Frederick Gebbie (1871–1939), British civil engineer
George Gebbie (1832–1892), Scottish American publisher
Katharine Gebbie (1932–2016), American astrophysicist and civil servant
Kristine Gebbie (born 1943), American academic and public health official
Luke Gebbie (born 1996), Filipino Olympic swimmer
Melinda Gebbie, American writer
Oswald Gebbie (1878–1956), Argentine rugby union footballer